Monu Island is an uninhabited island of the Mamanuca Islands, Fiji. It is located 700 metres west of Yanuya. It is 1,370 metres long from north to south, and up to 1,070 metres wide.

See also

 Desert island
 List of islands

References

Uninhabited islands of Fiji
Mamanuca Islands